North Charlton is a hamlet and former civil parish, now in the parish of Eglingham in Northumberland, in England. It is situated between Alnwick and Berwick-upon-Tweed, on the A1. In 1951 the civil parish had a population of 90. On 1 April 1955 the civil parish was merged into Eglingham. A notable country house is Charlton Hall, Northumberland which is now a wedding venue.

Governance 
North Charlton is in the parliamentary constituency of Berwick-upon-Tweed.

References

External links

Hamlets in Northumberland
Former civil parishes in Northumberland
Eglingham